Cross-country skiing at the 2017 European Youth Olympic Winter Festival is held at the Palandoken Ski Centre in Erzurum, Turkey  from 13 to 17 February 2017.

Medal table

Results

Boys events

Ladies events

Mixed events

References

External links
 Results Book – Cross-Country Skiing

2017 in cross-country skiing
2017 European Youth Olympic Winter Festival events
2017